Kari Suomi was a Finnish linguist who was an assistant professor from 1985 to 2012 in the Department of Phonetics at the University of Oulu. He has researched English, Swedish and Finnish phonology.

His textbook Introduction to Speech Acoustics has been used for university teaching in Finnish phonetics, speech therapy and vocology since 1990.

His other two textbooks with Toivanen and Ylitalo are Fundamentals of Phonetics and Finnish Sound Theory, 2006, and Finnish Sound Structure – Phonetics, phonology, phonotactics and prosody, 2008.

Works

Academic theses 
  (Master's Thesis)
  (Doctoral Thesis)

International publications

Papers from Finnish phoneticians

Textbooks

References

External links 
 
 

Academic staff of the University of Oulu
Living people
Year of birth missing (living people)
Phonologists